Anup Sengupta is a Bengali film Director and Producer. Actress Piya Sengupta is his wife and his son Bonny Sengupta is also an actor. Indraneil Sengupta, his brother is also an actor.

Filmography

Director
 Jaanbaaz (2019)
 Bangla Banchao (2011)
 Pratidwandi (2010)
 Mama Bhagne (2010)
 Badla (2009)
 Ghar Jamai (2008)
 Mahaguru (2007)
 Chore Chore Mastuto Bhai (2005)
 Dadar Adesh (2005)
 Paribar (2004)
 Pratishodh (2004)
 Raja Babu (2004)
 Mayer Anchal (2003)
 Inquilaab (2002)
 Sonar Sansar (2002)
 Aghat (2001)
 Harjit (2000)
 Sajoni Aamar Sohag (2000)
 Shatruta (2000)
 Banglar Badhu (1998)
 Sindurer Adhikar (1998)
 Pabitra Papi (1997)
 Sinthir Sindur (1996)
 Pratidhwani (1995)
 Shubha Kamana (1991)
 Asha (1989)

Producer
 Ghar Jamai (2008)
 Mahaguru (2007)
 Dadar Adesh (2005)
 Paribar (2004)

References

External links
 
 Anup Sengupta in Gomolo

Living people
Bengali film producers
Bengali film directors
Bengali Hindus
Indian Hindus
21st-century Indian film directors
Year of birth missing (living people)
Film directors from West Bengal
Film directors from Kolkata